Josef Just (born 19 March 1973) is a retired Czech football player who played in the Czech First League for FK Teplice and FK Jablonec.

References

External links
 

1973 births
Living people
Czech footballers
Czech Republic under-21 international footballers
Association football midfielders
Czech First League players
FK Teplice players
FK Jablonec players